Kakot is a union council of Abbottabad District in Khyber-Pakhtunkhwa province of Pakistan. According to the 2017 Census of Pakistan, the population is 7,815.

Subdivisions
 Bandi Matratch
 Bazurgal
 Garamri
 Go Garhi
 Kakot
 Pando Thana
 Pasial
 Patheri Seydan
 Peshail
 Sargal
 Sher Bai
 Sial
 Talehar

References

Union councils of Abbottabad District